Megachile zambesica is a species of bee in the family Megachilidae. It was described by Pasteels in 1965. The name is a junior homonym of Megachile zambesica Cockerell, named in 1937.

References

zambesica
Insects described in 1965